Nathaniel Ely (also Nathaniel Eli)  (1605 – December 25, 1675) was a founding settler of Hartford and Norwalk, Connecticut. He served as a deputy of the General Court of the Connecticut Colony from Norwalk in the October 1656 session.

He was born in 1605 in Tenterden, Kent, England. He was the son of the Reverend Nathaniel Ely and Susan Dowle.

He came to America, sailing from Ipswich aboard the Elizabeth, in 1634. He originally settled in Cambridge, Massachusetts Bay Colony.

Settlement of Hartford 
In June 1636, Reverend Thomas Hooker led a group of about one hundred people including Ely to Hartford. He served there as a constable in 1639, and as a selectman in 1643 and 1649.

Settlement of Norwalk 
Roger Ludlow purchased the land that would become Norwalk in 1640. Ludlow contracted with fourteen men for the original planting of Norwalk. In 1649, Ely and Richard Olmsted became the first two settlers. He served in the General Court of the Colony of Connecticut representing Norwalk in 1656. He lived in Norwalk until 1659.

He then moved to Springfield, Massachusetts Bay Colony. He served as a selectman there in 1661, 1663, 1666, 1668, 1671 and 1673. After 1665, he was a tavern keeper.

He is listed on the Founders Stone bearing the names of the founders of Hartford in the Ancient Burying Ground in Hartford, and he is also listed on the Founders Stone bearing the names of the founding settlers of Norwalk in the East Norwalk Historical Cemetery.

References 

1605 births
1675 deaths
American Puritans
Connecticut city council members
Deputies of the Connecticut General Court (1639–1662)
Founding settlers of Norwalk, Connecticut
Massachusetts city council members
Founders of Hartford, Connecticut
Politicians from Springfield, Massachusetts
People from Tenterden
Saloonkeepers
Businesspeople from Springfield, Massachusetts